The ARIBAS, New Vallabh Vidhyanagar, Gujarat, India is an Institute of Science offering mainly master's degree programmes. The Institute was established in 2005. It is affiliated with Sardar Patel University.

It is the first institute to offer the Integrated Biotechnology course in the state of Gujarat.

The major courses run at ARIBAS are MSc Biotechnology, MSc Integrated Biotechnology (5½ Years after 12th grade), MSc Microbiology, MSc Genetics and MSc Pharmaceutical Chemistry.

The institute also offers PhD and bachelor's degrees in Biochemistry, Botany, Biotechnology, Genetics, Pharmaceutical Chemistry and Physics, among others.

References

Universities and colleges in Gujarat
Educational institutions established in 2005
Education in Anand district
Biotechnology in India
2005 establishments in Gujarat